Skenea rugulosa is a species of minute sea snail, a marine gastropod mollusk in the family Skeneidae.

Description
The size of the shell varies between 0.75 mm and 1.5 mm.
The shell is narrowly umbilicated. It is pellucid, yellowish white. The short, obtuse spire is smooth, microscopically rugulose and spirally striate. It contains three convex whorls with the body whorl large. The suture is well-impressed.

Distribution
This species occurs in northern European waters off Iceland, the Faroes, southern Norway and in the Barents Sea.

References

 Sars G. O., 1878: Bidrag til kundskaben om Norges arktiske fauna: 1. Mollusca regionis Arcticae Norvegiae. Oversigt over de i Norges arktiske region forekommende bloddyr Christiania, A.W. Brøgger XV + 466 p., 34 pl
 Gofas, S.; Le Renard, J.; Bouchet, P. (2001). Mollusca, in: Costello, M.J. et al. (Ed.) (2001). European register of marine species: a check-list of the marine species in Europe and a bibliography of guides to their identification. Collection Patrimoines Naturels, 50: pp. 180–213

External links
 

rugulosa
Gastropods described in 1878